Estádio do Fontelo (Fontelo Stadium) is a stadium in Viseu, Portugal. It was completed and opened to the public in December 1928. It is mostly used for football matches and hosts the home matches of Académico de Viseu.

History
In 2003 the stadium hosted the 2003 UEFA European Under-17 Football Championship final.

Portugal national football team
The national team first played in the stadium in 2000 and the latest game took place in 2017.

2003 UEFA European U-17 matches
The stadium was one of the venues of the 2003 UEFA European Under-17 Championship, and held the following matches:

References 

Buildings and structures in Viseu District
Football venues in Portugal
Sport in Viseu
Buildings and structures in Viseu
Sports venues completed in 1928